Hoho may refer to:

 Ho Hos, a brand of snack cakes
 Hoho, Finland, a village
 Hoho, a monkey on the television show Ni Hao, Kai-Lan